Agarivorans albus is a Gram-negative, strictly aerobic and mesophilic bacterium from the genus of Agarivorans which has been isolated from the coast of Kanto in Japan.

References

External links
Type strain of Agarivorans albus at BacDive -  the Bacterial Diversity Metadatabase

Bacteria described in 2004
Alteromonadales